The National Parks of Spain are set out in the following table in alphabetical order. They are defined under Spanish Law 41/1997, which established a new model of shared management of the national parks between the National and the Regional Governments.

Links are to the corresponding web site of the Ministry of Agriculture, Food and Environment of Spain, and are in Spanish.

National parks

See also

 List of national parks of Spain

References 

 02
Spain
National parks
.National parks